Jet-2000 Business Jets, established in 1999, is a business aviation provider specialising in management for corporate and private aircraft in Russia and other countries of the post-Soviet area. The company holds a Russian Air Operator Certificate.

Fleet
As of July 2022, the Jet-2000 fleet includes the following aircraft types:
Antonov AN-74D

References

External links
Official Website (Russian)
Official website (English)

Airlines of Russia
Airlines established in 1999
Companies based in Moscow
Charter airlines
1999 establishments in Russia